Germantown or German Town may refer to:

Places

Australia 

 Germantown, Queensland, a locality in the Cassowary Coast Region

United States 

 Germantown, California, the former name of Artois, a census-designated place in Glenn County
 Germantown, Connecticut, a neighborhood of Danbury, Connecticut
 Germantown, Illinois, a village in Clinton County
 Germantown, Decatur County, Indiana, an unincorporated town
 Germantown, Iowa, an unincorporated community in O'Brien County
 Germantown, Kentucky, a city in Bracken and Mason counties
 Germantown, Louisville, a neighborhood in Louisville, Kentucky
 Germantown, Anne Arundel County, Maryland, an unincorporated community
 Germantown, Baltimore County, Maryland, an unincorporated community of Perry Hall, Maryland
 Germantown, Maryland, a census-designated place in Montgomery County and the only "Germantown, Maryland" recognized by the United States Postal Service
 Germantown, Worcester County, Maryland, an unincorporated community
 Germantown, Quincy, Massachusetts, a residential neighborhood
 Germantown, Missouri, an unincorporated community
 Germantown (town), New York, a town in Columbia County, New York
 Germantown, Allegany County, New York, a neighborhood of the town of Clarksville
 Germantown, Orange County, New York, a neighborhood of the city of Port Jervis
 Germantown, Nebraska, the former name of the village of Garland
 Germantown, North Carolina, an unincorporated community in Hyde County, North Carolina
 Germantown, Ohio, a city located in Montgomery County, Ohio
 Germantown, Washington County, Ohio, an unincorporated community
 Germantown, Philadelphia, a neighborhood of Philadelphia, former town
 Colonial Germantown Historic District, in Philadelphia, Pennsylvania, listed on the National Register of Historic Places
 Germantown Township, Turner County, South Dakota
 Germantown Historic District, Nashville, listed on the NRHP in Tennessee
 Germantown, Shelby County, Tennessee, a city near Memphis
 Germantown, Virginia, an historic unincorporated rural community in Fauquier County
 Germantown, Wisconsin, a village in Washington County
 Germantown, Juneau County, Wisconsin, a town
 Germantown, Washington County, Wisconsin, a town

Military 
 Battle of Germantown, in the American Revolutionary War
 USS Germantown (1846), a sloop-of-war
 USS Germantown (LSD-42), a 1984 Whidbey Island–class dock landing ship

Other uses 
 Germantown Academy, in Philadelphia, Pennsylvania, the oldest non-sectarian day school in the United States
 Germantown Colony and Museum, a historical preservation project in Louisiana
 Germantown Cricket Club, a cricket club located in the Germantown neighborhood of Philadelphia, Pennsylvania

See also 
 Germantown, Indiana (disambiguation)
 Germantown, Maryland (disambiguation)
 Germantown, New York (disambiguation)
 Germantown, Pennsylvania (disambiguation)
 Germantown, Tennessee (disambiguation)
 Germantown High School (disambiguation)
 Germantown station (disambiguation)
 Germantown Township (disambiguation)